Ṭālib ibn Abī Ṭālib was a first cousin of the Islamic prophet Muhammad and a brother of Ali.

Family

He was born in Mecca, the eldest son of Abu Talib ibn Abd al-Muttalib and of Fatimah bint Asad. The young Muhammad lived in their house from the time he and Talib were both eight years old.

He had no offspring..

Inheritance Law

When his father Abu Talib died in 620, his inheritance was divided between Talib and his brother Aqil. Their two younger brothers, Ja'far and Ali, did not inherit anything.

Battle of Badr

In 624 Talib set out with the Meccan army to rescue the merchant-caravan that was threatened with a Muslim attack. When word came from Abu Sufyan that the caravan had arrived safely home so there was no need to continue the march, some of the Quraysh nevertheless wanted to continue as far as Badr. They said to Talib: "We know, O Son of Hashim, that if you have come out with us, your heart is with Muhammad." A poem about his decision to return to Mecca is attributed to him.

O God, if Talib goes forth to war unwillingly with one of these squadrons,
Let him be the plundered not the plunderer, the vanquished not the victor.

After some discussion, Talib decided not to accompany them. Talib never arrived in Mecca. He was never seen again and his body was never found.

References 

Family of Muhammad
Shia Islam
595 births
661 deaths
6th-century Arabs
7th-century Arabs